Pedioplanis breviceps, known commonly as the short-headed sand lizard, the short-headed sandveld lizard, and Sternfeld's sand lizard, is a species of lizard in the family Lacertidae. The species is endemic to Namibia.

Geographic range
P. breviceps is found in northwestern Namibia.

Habitat
The preferred natural habitat of P. breviceps is desert.

Description
P. breviceps is a small species for its genus. It has a short head, to which the specific name, breviceps, refers. The lower eyelid is scaly and opaque, without a "window". There is sexual dimorphism in coloration: adult females and juveniles have distinct dark dorsal stripes, but adult males are uniformly brown dorsally.

Reproduction
P. breviceps is oviparous. An adult female may lay a clutch of 2–4 eggs.

References

Further reading
Conradie W, Measey GJ, Branch WR, Tolley KA (2012). "Revised phylogeny of African sand lizards (Pedioplanis), with description of two new species from south-western Angola". African Journal of Herpetology 61 (2): 91–112.
Makokha JS, Mayer W, Matthee CA (2007). "Nuclear and mtDNA-based phylogeny of southern African sand lizards, Pedioplanis (Sauria: Lacertidae)". Molecular Phylogenetics and Evolution 44 (2): 622–633.
Sternfeld R (1911). "Zur Herpetologie Südwestafrikas ". Mitteilungen aus dem Zoologischen Museum in Berlin 5: 393–411. (Eremias breviceps, new species, p. 404, Figure 2). (in German).

Pedioplanis
Lacertid lizards of Africa
Reptiles of Namibia
Endemic fauna of Namibia
Reptiles described in 1911
Taxa named by Richard Sternfeld